William Ballantine (1812–1887) was an English Serjeant-at-law.

William Ballantine is also the name of:

William Ballantine (priest) (1616/1618–1661), Roman Catholic clergyman who became the first Prefect of Scotland
William Ballantine (MP) (1847–1911), British Member of Parliament for Coventry 1887–1895
Bill Ballantine (illustrator) (1910–1999), American illustrator of circus subjects
Bill Ballantine (biologist) (1937–2015), marine biologist from New Zealand